A voting district may be:
 An electoral district
 A geographical area assigned to a specific polling place, such as:
An electoral precinct in the United States
In elections in South Africa, a voting district associated with a specific voting station